Mange Ram Garg (1935/1936 – 21 July 2019) was a leader of Bharatiya Janata Party and a member of Delhi Legislative Assembly. A confectioner by profession, Garg joined active politics comparatively late but took massive strides in the ensuing years. He registered his first political win of note back in 2003 when he won from the Wazirpur assembly constituency. In the next Assembly election - in 2008, Garg lost to Congress' Hari Shanker Gupta but by a very slim margin of about three thousand votes. He was entrusted with many significant responsibilities of BJP in Delhi during his political life. Under him, BJP registered strong performances in local municipal body elections as well.

He pledged his organs to Dadhichi Deh Dan Samiti. Accordingly, his mortal remains were taken to Lady Hardinge Medical College after his death.

References

1930s births
2019 deaths
Members of the Delhi Legislative Assembly
Bharatiya Janata Party politicians from Delhi